Leif Henry Salmén (19 January 1952 Helsinki – 19 November 2019 Helsinki) was a Finnish author, journalist and poet.

Career
Salmén studied at Helsinki University with philosophy as his major between 1971 and 1976. He was a member of the Communist Party of Finland from the 1970s until mid-1980s. Salmén was a Taistoist.

Salmén was a TV journalist working for Yleisradio from 1976 to 1989. He was among the best-known media personalities in Finland in the 1980s because of his rapid-fire interviews and uncompromised grilling of politicians and the elite.

After that Salmén worked as a columnist, essayist and a poet. Several of his books were translated into Finnish. Among other honours, Salmén received the Eino Leino Prize in 2013.

Works
 Vår korta stund tillsammans. Söderström, 1976
 Att varje dag. Söderström, 1978
 Begäret. Söderström, 1980
 Dans och tystnad. Söderström, 1982
 Finländsk bokföring: Dagbok från tredje republiken. Söderström, 1983
 Ikon. Söderström, 1986
 Vintermonolog: Dagbok från tredje republiken. Söderström, 1987
 Duvorna på Plaza Real. Söderström, 1990
 Livet i förorten. Söderström, 1992
 Fjärde republiken: Oregelbundna anteckningar. Söderström, 1994
 Men Marx menade motsatsen. Söderström, 1996
 Promenader i Leninparken. Söderström, 2000
 Palatset vid Bosporen: Essäer. Söderström, 2005
 Ner från Akropolis. Söderström, 2008
 Den underjordiska moskén. Schildts & Söderströms, 2013
 Det orientaliska rummet. Förlaget, 2017

References

1952 births
2019 deaths
Journalists from Helsinki
Finnish poets
University of Helsinki alumni
Finnish communists
Swedish-speaking Finns
Writers from Helsinki